The Nikkei Sho (Japanese 日経賞) is a Japanese Grade 2 flat horse race in Japan for Thoroughbreds of at least four years of age. It is run over a distance of 2,500 metres at Nakayama Racecourse in March.

The Nikkei Sho was first run in 1953 and was elevated to Grade 2 status in 1984.

Among the winners of the race have been Symboli Rudolf, Rice Shower, Meisho Doto, Matsurida Gogh, Fenomeno and Gold Actor.

Winners since 2000 

 The 2011 race took place at Hanshin Racecourse over a distance of 2,400 metres.

Earlier winners

See also
 Horse racing in Japan
 List of Japanese flat horse races

References

Turf races in Japan